El Nouzha Airport or Alexandria International Airport  was an international airport serving Alexandria, Egypt,  southeast of the city center. In 2009, the airport served 1,142,412 passengers (−1.8% vs. 2008). The airport was shut down for major renovations in 2011, and all traffic was transferred to Borg El Arab Airport. The government subsequently announced that the airport will no longer reopen.

Overview
The future of the airport was in doubt with the opening of Borg El Arab Airport. In early 2011, the Egyptian Ministry of Civil Aviation announced major plans to overhaul the airport and its facilities to ensure its future as one of the two commercial airports for Alexandria and Nile Delta region. The renovation project was expected to cost US$120 million, which would have included lengthening the main runway (04/22) by an additional 750m and the construction of a new passenger terminal to replace the existing aging facility. Due to the length of the old runways, the largest aircraft operating into the airport were the Airbus A320-200, Boeing 737-800, and McDonnell Douglas MD-90.

The airport was closed down by December 2011 to implement the expansion project and development and was scheduled to be reopened end of 2014. As of January 2016, the airport still remained closed. Satellite images showed the airports runways to be resurfaced and extended while the terminal site remains unfinished and abandoned. Since then, it has been announced officially by the government that the airport will close completely and become defunct.

Airlines and destinations 
The airport originally was closed for refurbishment and there are no longer any services. The airport previously offered services to domestic destinations within Egypt and cities across the Arab world. EgyptAir and its subsidiary EgyptAir Express were the largest airlines at the airport, operating over 50 weekly domestic and regional flights with a mixture of Airbus A320-200s and Embraer E-170s.

See also 
List of airports in Egypt

References

External links

 
 

Defunct airports in Egypt
Airports in Egypt
Buildings and structures in Alexandria
Tourist attractions in Alexandria
Transport in Alexandria